Fernand Delarge (born 13 April 1904, date of death unknown) was a Belgian boxer who competed in the 1924 Summer Olympics. He was born in Liège.

In 1924 he was eliminated in the first round of the light heavyweight class after losing to the upcoming bronze medalist Sverre Sørsdal.

After the Olympics Delarge turned pro and won the European Championship in 1926 against Herman van't Hoff. After two successful title defences he lost the title to Max Schmeling in 1927.

References

External links
 

1904 births
Year of death missing
Light-heavyweight boxers
Olympic boxers of Belgium
Boxers at the 1924 Summer Olympics
European Boxing Union champions
Sportspeople from Liège
Belgian male boxers